Tavagnacco is a comune (municipality) in the Province of Udine in the Italian region Friuli-Venezia Giulia, located about  northwest of Trieste and about  north of Udine. The municipal seat is in the frazione of Feletto Umberto.

Tavagnacco borders the following municipalities: Martignacco, Pagnacco, Pasian di Prato, Reana del Rojale, Tricesimo and Udine (whose metropolitan area it belongs to).

References

External links
 Official website

Cities and towns in Friuli-Venezia Giulia